Gibberula aldridgei is a species of sea snail, a marine gastropod mollusk, in the family Cystiscidae.

This is a taxon inquirendum.

Distribution
This marine species occurs off the Virgin Islands.

References

 Nowell-Usticke, G. W. 1969. A supplementary listing of new shells (illustrated). To be added to the Check List of the marine shells of St. Croix. Burlington, Vermont: Lane Press. 32 pp., 6 pls.

aldridgei
Gastropods described in 1969
Cystiscidae